Shane William Desmond Alexander, 2nd Earl Alexander of Tunis (born 30 June 1935), styled Lord Rideau between 1952 and 1969, is a British hereditary peer.

He was a member of the House of Lords from 1969 until 1999.

Biography
Alexander is the elder son of Field Marshal Harold Alexander, 1st Earl Alexander of Tunis and Lady Margaret Bingham (1905–1977), daughter of George Bingham, 5th Earl of Lucan. He was educated at Harrow, Ashbury College, and the Mons Officer Cadet School. On 14 August 1954, he was commissioned as a second lieutenant into the Irish Guards. On 16 June 1969, he succeeded his father in the earldom, following his death.

Alexander served as a Lord-in-waiting from 8 January 1974 until 4 March 1974, at the end of Edward Heath's premiership. He has also been a director of the Pathfinder Financial Corporation (firm.dissolved 1988) in Toronto in 1980.

He was a member of the House of Lords from 1969 until the House of Lords Act 1999 came into force in November of that year.

As a descendant of the Earls of Caledon, he is also in the remainder to that title and was the heir presumptive from 1980 to 1990.

Marriages and children
Alexander married firstly Hilary van Geest on 14 July 1971. They were divorced in 1976 without having had any children.

He married secondly Davinia Mary Woodhouse, daughter of David Woodhouse, 4th Baron Terrington, on 22 July 1981. She is a former lady-in-waiting to Princess Margaret, Countess of Snowdon. They have two daughters:

 Lady Rose Margaret Alexander (born 23 April 1982), a god-daughter of Princess Margaret, who married James Hardinge Houssemayne Du Boulay on 6 February 2015 and has issue;
 Lady Lucy Caroline Alexander (born 1984), who married James Shaun Christian Welbore Ellis Agar, 7th Earl of Normanton, in June 2012 and has issue.

As Alexander has no son, the heir presumptive to his earldom is his younger brother, the Honourable Brian James Alexander, CMG (born 1939). He is the last person in line to succeed to the earldom and subsidiary titles.

References

External links

A photograph of Lord Alexander of Tunis en route to school in 1948 in La Patrie (a French-language Montreal daily, now defunct).

1935 births
Shane
Conservative Party (UK) hereditary peers
Shane
Graduates of the Mons Officer Cadet School
Living people
People educated at Harrow School
Irish Guards officers
Place of birth missing (living people)
Alexander of Tunis